...And Give Us Our Daily Sex is a 1979 Italian-Spanish film directed by José Ramón Larraz, written by Larraz and Sergio Garrone, and starring Laura Gemser and Bárbara Rey.

Plot
Alfonso is a teenager who lives in a wealthy family, with an adulterous mother and a foolish father. As he experiences his first sexual impulses, Alfonso discovers that a couple of charming nurses live upstairs in his apartment, so he will look for any excuse to get in touch with them, including building a handmade periscope to spy on them.

Cast
 Laura Gemser as Verónica's friend
 Bárbara Rey as Verónica
 Ángel Herraiz as Alfonso
 Mila Stanic as  Carla, Alfonso's mother
 José Castillo as Don Ignacio, Alfonso's father
 Alfred Lucchetti as Carla's lover (as Alfredo Luchetti)
 José Sazatornil as José Antonio Cañavate (as José Sazatornil 'Saza')
 José María Cañete as Editorial Employee (como José Mª Cañete)
 Francisco Jarque as Pawn Shop Clerk
 Daniele Vargas as Oculist (as Danielle Vargas)
 Jordi Bofill as Leatherworking owner (uncredited)
 Manuel Bronchud as False policeman (uncredited)
 Mir Ferry as Hairdresser (uncredited)
 Amparo Moreno as Felisa (uncredited)
 Gabriele Tinti as Professor (uncredited)
 Arnau Vilardebó as  Hairdresser client (uncredited)

Production
The film is part of a wave of softcore pornographic films made in Spain during the second half of the 1970s, part of a cultural trend known as el destape ("the uncovering"). It is one of a group of Italy-Spain softcore film co-productions, alongside Historia de Eva/Piccole labbra (1978), both featuring Bárbara Rey.

The film is one of Gemser's films that features her husband Gabriele Tinti in a minor role.

Release
The film was released in Spain on 26 February 1979 and in Italy on 5 December 1979. It was released in Mexico at the Bergman, Chaplin II, Del Pueblo II and Kubrick theaters on 23 December 1983, for two weeks.

It was released in Germany as Zeig mir, wie man's macht ("Show me how to do it").

References

External links
 

1979 films
1970s Spanish-language films
Italian sex comedy films
Spanish sex comedy films
Films directed by José Ramón Larraz
1970s sex comedy films
1970s Italian films